Pinedale Shores may refer to the following populated places in Alabama, United States:

Pinedale Shores, Marshall County, Alabama
Pinedale Shores, Saint Clair County, Alabama

See also
Pinedale (disambiguation)